The implementation of the Dayton Accords of 1995 has focused the efforts of policymakers in Bosnia and Herzegovina, as well as the international community, on regional stabilization in the countries-successors of the former Yugoslavia. Relations with its neighbors of Croatia, Montenegro and Serbia have been fairly stable since the signing of the Dayton Agreement in 1995.

Diplomatic relations 
Bosnia and Herzegovina maintains diplomatic relations with 182 United Nations member states.

Bilateral relations

EU accession
The accession of Bosnia and Herzegovina to the European Union is one of the main political objectives of Bosnia and Herzegovina. The Stabilisation and Association Process (SAP) is the EU's policy framework. Countries participating in the SAP have been offered the possibility to become, once they fulfill the necessary conditions, member states of the EU. Bosnia and Herzegovina is therefore a potential candidate country for EU accession.

International organizations
Bank for International Settlements, Council of Europe, Central European Initiative, EBRD,
Energy Community United Nations Economic Commission for Europe, FAO, Group of 77, IAEA, IBRD, ICAO, International Criminal Court, International Development Association, IFAD, International Finance Corporation, IFRCS, ILO, International Monetary Fund, International Maritime Organization, Interpol, IOC, International Organization for Migration (observer), ISO, ITU, Non-Aligned Movement (guest), Organization of American States (observer), OIC (observer), OPCW, Organization for Security and Co-operation in Europe, Southeast European Cooperative Initiative, United Nations, UNCTAD, UNESCO, UNIDO, UNMEE, UPU, WHO, WIPO, WMO, WToO, WTrO (observer)

See also
 Bosnia and Herzegovina and the International Monetary Fund
 List of diplomatic missions in Bosnia and Herzegovina
 List of diplomatic missions of Bosnia and Herzegovina
 Visa requirements for Bosnia and Herzegovina citizens
 Foreign relations of Yugoslavia

References

External links
 Ministry of Foreign Affairs - policy priorities